Ahandan Rural District is a rural district (dehestan) in the Central District of Lahijan County, Gilan Province, Iran. At the 2006 census, its population was 11,859, in 3,270 families.

References 

Rural Districts of Gilan Province
Lahijan County